Jahnoah Guevara Markelo (born 4 January 2003) is a Dutch football player. He plays as a right winger for Eredivisie club Go Ahead Eagles.

Career
On 19 May 2022, Markelo signed a three-year contract with Go Ahead Eagles.

He made his Eredivisie debut for Go Ahead Eagles on 27 August 2022 in a game against Sparta Rotterdam.

Personal life
His older brother Nathangelo Markelo is also a footballer.

References

External links
 

2003 births
Footballers from Amsterdam
Dutch people of Surinamese descent
Living people
Dutch footballers
Association football forwards
FC Twente players
Go Ahead Eagles players
Eredivisie players